Asura ruenca is a moth of the family Erebidae first described by Charles Swinhoe in 1892. It is found on the Sula Islands of Indonesia.

References

ruenca
Moths described in 1892
Moths of Indonesia